Branko Damljanović (born 17 June 1961 in Novi Sad) is a Serbian grandmaster. His rating peaked at 2625 in July 2006. His chess career started in 1975 in Čačak. He is now a selector.

References

External links

1961 births
Sportspeople from Novi Sad
Chess grandmasters
Serbian chess players
Yugoslav chess players
Living people